is a five star hotel in Nara, Japan. The hotel is located on the hillside overlooking Nara Park. Opened on October 17, 1909, it is one of the most historic hotels in Japan. It is partially owned by the West Japan Railway Company. In 2009 the first centennial anniversary of the hotel was celebrated.

Famous guests 
Various crowned and uncrowned heads of state, members of royal families, heads of government, politicians, actors, artists, and other notable persons have stayed at the hotel.

 Emperor Taishō and Empress Teimei, with Crown Prince Hirohito, in 1916
 Kyoshi Takahama, Japanese poet, in 1916
 Sergei Prokofiev, Russian composer, on May 19–27, 1918 
 Count Nogi Maresuke, Japanese general, in 1911
 Crown Prince Hirohito, in 1921
 Bertrand Russell, British mathematician, on July 19, 1921
 Edward, Prince of Wales, in 1922
 Albert Einstein, Swiss physicist, on December 17–18, 1922
 Emperor Shōwa and Empress Kōjun, in 1928
 Prince Henry, Duke of Gloucester, in 1929
 Charles Lindbergh, American aviator, in 1931
 Emperor Shōwa, in 1932 and 1940
 Emperor Puyi, in 1935. He gave medals to all the staff of the hotel. 
 Charlie Chaplin, in 1936
 Empress Kōjun, in 1937 and 1941, 1954
 Helen Keller, American social welfare entrepreneur, in 1937
 José P. Laurel, former Philippine President, in 1945 for two months
 Richard Nixon, U.S. vice-president, in 1953
 Joe DiMaggio, 1954, Marilyn Monroe canceled her reservation
 Marlon Brando, American actor, in 1956
 Glenn Ford, American actor, in 1956
 Jawaharlal Nehru, Indian prime minister, and his daughter Indira Gandhi, in 1957
 Princess Alexandra of Kent, in 1961
 John Diefenbaker, Canadian prime minister, in 1961
 Arturo Frondizi, Argentine president, in 1961
 Robert F. Kennedy, U.S. Attorney General, in 1962
 Princess Margrethe, The Hereditary Princess of Denmark, in 1963
 Prince Takamatsu, in 1964
 King Baudouin of Belgium, in 1964
 Premier of France, in 1964
 Prince of Laos, in 1965
 Prince of Spain, in 1966
 Prince Chichibu, in 1967
 Prince of Nepal, in 1967
 Crown Prince Naruhito, in 1968
 Gaston Eyskens, Belgian prime minister, in 1969
 Emperor Showa and Empress Kojun, in 1970
 Prince Takamatsu and Princess Takamatsu, in 1970
 Queen Beatrix of the Netherlands, in 1970
 Princess Margaret, Countess of Snowdon, in 1970
 Pope Paul VI, in 1970
 Prince Fumihito, in 1970
 Emperor Showa and Empress Kojun, in 1979 and 1981
 Yul Brynner, in 1980
 Audrey Hepburn, British actress, March 31-April 2, 1983
 Crown Prince Akihito and Crown Princess Michiko, with daughter Princess Sayako, in 1987
 Prince Akishino and Princess Akishino, in 1990
 Václav Havel, Czechoslovak president, in 1992
 Prince Edward, Duke of Kent, in 1992
 Emperor Heisei and Empress Michiko, in 2002 and 2008
 14th Dalai Lama, Tibetan spiritual head, in 2003
 Hu Jintao, Chinese president, in 2008

Gallery

See also 
 Fujiya Hotel
 Nikkō Kanaya Hotel
 Nagoya Hotel
 Imperial Hotel, Tokyo
 Hōshi Ryokan
 Dōgo Onsen

References

External links 

 Nara Hotel, from The Official Nara Travel Guide

Hotels in Nara Prefecture
Tourist attractions in Nara Prefecture
Buildings of the Meiji period
Railway hotels
Hotels established in 1909
1909 establishments in Japan
Hotel buildings completed in 1909
Hotel buildings completed in 1984